Xestocasis hololampra is a moth in the family Oecophoridae described by Edward Meyrick in 1915. It is found in Australia, where it has been recorded from Queensland.

References

Oecophorinae